Trolltooth may refer to:

Trolltooth Pass
The Trolltooth Wars